Jermain Baxter (born December 5, 1972), better known as Nature, is an American rapper, best known for his association with fellow New York City rapper Nas and having replaced Cormega in the original QB group the Firm.

Career
Baxter grew up in Queensbridge, New York, and went to school with Nas. Nas introduced Nature to the public in 1997, as a member of his supergroup The Firm, whose members also included AZ and Foxy Brown. Nature was brought in to replace rapper Cormega, who had a contractual dispute with Nas' manager Steve Stoute. The Firm's first and only album, Nas, Foxy Brown, AZ, and Nature Present The Firm: The Album, went platinum, and topped the Billboard 200 album chart.

The group disbanded in 1997 to pursue various solo projects. In 1998, Nature was featured on Noreaga's single "Banned from T.V.", alongside Big Pun, Cam'ron, Jadakiss and Styles P. After several delays, Nature's debut album For All Seasons, was released in 2000 by Columbia Records and featured a guest appearance from Nas. It reached number 50 on the Billboard 200. He followed this in 2002 with Wild Gremlinz, released on independent Sequence Records, which reached number 150 on the Billboard 200 but reached number 9 on the Independent Albums chart. Three of his tracks were included on the soundtrack of the film Angels in America in 2003. A third album, Pain Killer, was released in 2008 with production largely handled by Scram Jones, Dub Sonata & Mes. Nature released a series of EP's titled Seasons Changed in 2013-2014 under DCM.

Discography

Studio albums
For All Seasons (2000)
Wild Gremlinz (2002)
Pain Killer (2008)
Target Practice (2016)

Collaborative albums
The Firm: The Album (with The Firm) (1997)

Compilation albums
Seasons Changed (2015)
Queens Classics (2016)
Queens Classics 2 (2017)

Mixtapes
The Nature Files: The Best of Nature Vol.1 (2007)
The Lost Tapes Volume 1 (2008)
The Ashtray Effect (2013)
The Ashtray Effect Vol.2 (2015)
The Ashtray Effect Vol.3 (2015)

Extended plays
Seasons Changed: Spring Edition (2013)
Seasons Changed: Summer Edition (2013)
Seasons Changed: Fall Edition (2013)
Seasons Changed: Winter Edition (2014)

References

1972 births
African-American male rappers
Living people
People from Long Island City, Queens
Rappers from New York City
21st-century American rappers
The Firm (hip hop group) members
21st-century American male musicians
21st-century African-American musicians
20th-century African-American people